Amit Ramkumar Yadav (born 10 October 1989) is an Indian cricketer who plays for Goa cricket team. He is an all-rounder who bats right-handed and bowls right-arm off break. He made his first-class cricket debut for Goa in 2009/10. In 2012, he was involved in the IPL spot-fixing case while being a member of the Kings XI Punjab squad. He was banned from playing cricket for one year, and returned to domestic cricket in the 2013/14 season.

References

External links

Living people
1989 births
Indian cricketers
Goa cricketers
Punjab Kings cricketers
Cricketers from Goa
Cricketers banned for corruption